On the Wings of Inferno is the sixth album by Asphyx. It was released in 2000 by Century Media Records. Short after its release, Asphyx disbanded again, and On the Wings of Inferno would be their final studio album until they reunited in 2007 and released the seventh album, Death...The Brutal Way, in 2009.

This album was re-released on 13 November 2009 as a remastered version.

Track listing

Personnel
Asphyx
Eric Daniels - guitar 
Bob Bagchus - drums
Wannes Gubbels - vocals, bass guitar

Production
Axel Hermann - artwork, design
Erik de Boer - engineer, producer
Harry Wijering - engineer, producer
Ulf Horbelt - re-master

References

Asphyx albums
2000 albums
Century Media Records albums